The following is the final results of the 1993 Asian Wrestling Championships.

Medal table

Team ranking

Medal summary

Men's freestyle

Men's Greco-Roman

References
UWW Database

Asia
Wre
Wre
Asian Wrestling Championships
International wrestling competitions hosted by Mongolia
International wrestling competitions hosted by Japan